Doppelmayr or Doppelmayer may refer to:

Aerial lift manufacturers 
Doppelmayr Garaventa Group
Doppelmayr USA, a subsidiary of the above

Astronomy 
Johann Gabriel Doppelmayr (1677–1750), German mathematician, astronomer and cartographer
12622 Doppelmayr, a main-belt asteroid
Doppelmayer (crater), a lunar crater